The white-breasted antbird (Rhegmatorhina hoffmannsi) is a species of bird in the family Thamnophilidae. It is endemic to Brazil.

Its natural habitat is subtropical or tropical moist lowland forests.

This species is a specialist ant-follower that relies on swarms of army ants to flush insects and other arthropods out of the leaf litter.

References

white-breasted antbird
Birds of the Brazilian Amazon
Endemic birds of Brazil
white-breasted antbird
Taxonomy articles created by Polbot